Alexander Maurice Acker (born January 21, 1983) is an American-Italian professional basketball player who last played for Gallarate Basket of the Serie C Gold. He played college basketball for Pepperdine University. Acker was selected by the Detroit Pistons as the final pick of the 2005 NBA draft and spent two seasons in the National Basketball Association (NBA) with the Pistons and Los Angeles Clippers.

College career
Acker attended Pepperdine University, where he played college basketball with the Pepperdine Waves, from 2002 to 2005.

Professional career

NBA
After college, Acker was selected by the Detroit Pistons, with the last pick in the second round (60th overall) of the 2005 NBA draft. He played with the Pistons in 5 games, during the 2005–06 season, and he was also assigned to the NBA Development League's Fayetteville Patriots, on February 27, 2006.

Europe
From 2006 to 2008, Acker played with the Greek club Olympiacos, for whom he averaged 14.3 points, 5.6 rebounds, 2.4 assists, and 1.8 steals, in 22 games played (2006–07 EuroLeague season), and with the Spanish club AXA FC Barcelona, averaging 5.5 points, 1.9 rebounds and 0.7 assists and 0.7 steals, in 22 games played (2007–08 EuroLeague season).

Return to NBA
On September 29, 2008, it was announced that Acker had signed a deal with his former NBA team, the Detroit Pistons. On February 16, 2009, Acker was traded by Detroit to the Los Angeles Clippers, along with a second round draft pick in the 2011 NBA draft, in exchange for a conditional second round draft pick in the 2013 NBA draft. This trade was completed primarily for the Pistons to clear salary cap space, and to open up a roster spot for trade flexibility.

Return to Europe
On August 22, 2009, Acker signed with Armani Jeans Milano of Italy's LBA, for the 2009–10 season. In September 2010, Acker signed a one-year deal with Le Mans of France's LNB Pro A. On June 30, 2011, he re-signed with Le Mans for one more season.

On October 16, 2012, Acker signed a one-year contract with Asseco Prokom Gdynia of Poland's PLK. On December 21, 2012, he parted ways with Prokom. On February 14, 2013, he signed a two-month deal with Boulazac Dordogne of France.

On May 2, 2013, he signed with ASVEL of France, for the rest of the season. On June 28, 2013, he signed a one-year deal with Limoges of France. With Limoges, he won the 2013–14 LNB Pro A championship, and he was named the MVP of the Finals.

On October 25, 2014, Acker signed with İstanbul BB of Turkey. On December 29, 2014, he returned to France, and signed with his former team, ASVEL Basket. On July 10, 2015, he parted ways with ASVEL.

On August 26, 2015, Acker signed with Sidigas Avellino for the 2015–16 season. On October 27, 2016, Acker signed with Pallacanestro Cantù for the 2016–17 season. On October 25, 2017, Acker signed with Apollon Patras, of the Greek 2nd Division.

Career statistics

NBA

Regular season 

|-
| align="left" | 
| align="left" | Detroit
| 5 || 0 || 7.0 || .250 || .200 || .000 || 1.0 || .8 || .2 || .0 || 1.8
|-
| align="left" | 
| align="left" | Detroit
| 7 || 0 || 2.9 || .364 || .000 || .500 || .3 || .1 || .3 || .1 || 1.3
|-
| align="left" | 
| align="left" | L.A. Clippers
| 18 || 0 || 9.9 || .400 || .438 || .500 || 1.2 || .6 || .2 || .2 || 3.5
|-
| align="center" colspan=2 | Career
| 30 || 0 || 7.8 || .370 || .320 || .500 || 1.0 || .5 || .2 || .1 || 2.7

EuroLeague

|-
| style="text-align:left;"| 2006–07
| style="text-align:left;"| Olympiacos
| 22 || 22 || 32.6 || .492 || .318 || .868 || 5.6 || 2.4 || 1.6 || .4 || 14.3 || 15.7
|-
| style="text-align:left;"| 2007–08
| style="text-align:left;"| FC Barcelona
| 22 || 17 || 17.3 || .477 || .279 || .821 || 1.9 || .7 || .7 || .2 || 5.5 || 4.7
|-
| style="text-align:left;"| 2009–10
| style="text-align:left;"| Olimpia Milano
| 4 || 4 || 27.3 || .542 || .222 || .375 || 2.8 || 1.5 || 1.5 || .3 || 8.8 || 5.3
|-
| style="text-align:left;"| 2012–13
| style="text-align:left;"| Asseco Prokom Gdynia
| 9 || 7 || 22.5 || .300 || .381 || .818 || 2.7 || 0.7 || 0.3 || .1 || 6.3 || 2.4
|- class="sortbottom"
| style="text-align:center;" colspan=2 |  Career
| 57 || 50 || 24.7 || .469 || .307 || .826 || 3.5 || 1.4 || 1.1 || .2 || 9.2 || 8.6

References

External links
Career statistics and player information from NBA.com
Basketball-Reference.com Profile
Euroleague.net Profile
Eurobasket.com Profile
Spanish League Profile 
Italian League Profile 
Polish Basketball League Profile 

1983 births
Living people
American expatriate basketball people in France
American expatriate basketball people in Greece
American expatriate basketball people in Italy
American expatriate basketball people in Poland
American expatriate basketball people in Spain
American men's basketball players
ASVEL Basket players
Apollon Patras B.C. players
Basketball players from Compton, California
Detroit Pistons draft picks
Detroit Pistons players
Fayetteville Patriots players
FC Barcelona Bàsquet players
Fort Wayne Mad Ants players
İstanbul Büyükşehir Belediyespor basketball players
Italian men's basketball players
Lega Basket Serie A players
Le Mans Sarthe Basket players
Liga ACB players
Limoges CSP players
Los Angeles Clippers players
Olimpia Milano players
Olympiacos B.C. players
Pallacanestro Cantù players
Pepperdine Waves men's basketball players
Asseco Gdynia players
Shooting guards
Sportspeople from Rialto, California
S.S. Felice Scandone players